In typography, a dingbat (sometimes more formally known as a printer's ornament or printer's character) is an ornament, specifically, a glyph used in typesetting, often employed to create box frames (similar to box-drawing characters), or as a dinkus (section divider). Some of the dingbat symbols have been used as signature marks or used in bookbinding to order sections.

In the computer industry, a dingbat font was a computer font that has symbols and shapes that reused the code points designated for alphabetical or numeric characters. This practice was necessitated by the limited number of code points available in 20th century operating systems. Most modern fonts are based on Unicode, which has unique code points for dingbat glyphs.

Examples
Examples of characters included in Unicode (ITC Zapf Dingbats series 100 and others):

Dingbats Unicode block

Unicode provides code points for many commonly used dingbats, as listed below.  Prior to widespread adoption of Unicode in the early 2010s, "dingbat fonts" were created that allocated dingbat glyphs to codepoints in code positions otherwise allocated to "normal" character sets.

The Dingbats block (U+2700–U+27BF) (under the original block name "Zapf Dingbats") was added to the Unicode Standard in October 1991, with the release of version 1.0.
This code block contains decorative character variants, and other marks of emphasis and non-textual symbolism. Most of its characters were taken from Zapf Dingbats. The block name was changed from "Zapf Dingbats" to "Dingbats" in June 1993, with the release of 1.1.

Ornamental Dingbats Unicode block

The Ornamental Dingbats block was added to the Unicode Standard in June 2014 with the release of version 7.0.
This code block contains ornamental leaves, punctuation, and ampersands, quilt squares, and checkerboard patterns.
It is a subset of dingbat fonts Webdings, Wingdings, and Wingdings 2.

Character table

Dingbat fonts
 Webdings, a TrueType dingbat font designed at Microsoft and published in 1997
 Wingdings, a TrueType dingbat font assembled by Microsoft in 1990, using glyphs from Lucida Arrows, Lucida Icons, and Lucida Stars, three fonts they licensed from Charles Bigelow and Kris Holmes
 Zapf Dingbats, a dingbat font designed by Hermann Zapf in 1978, and licensed by International Typeface Corporation

See also
 Arrows in Unicode blocks
 Asterism (typography), a triangle of asterisks
 Fleuron (typography), known as a class of horticultural dingbats
 Punctuation
 Text semigraphics, a method for emulating raster graphics using text mode video hardware
 Unicode symbols

References

External links

 Retinart: A history of often-seen typographic marks
 Dingbat Depot: a large, well-known archive of free dingbat fonts.

Typography
Emoji